Kevin Dale Guidry (born May 16, 1964) is a former American football defensive back. He played for the Denver Broncos in 1988 and for the Phoenix Cardinals in 1989. He moved into public office in 2004, when he was first elected to the Calcasieu Parish Police Jury, serving as Vice-President in 2008 and President in 2010. He ran as a Democratic Party nominee for the Louisiana House of Representatives in 2019 as a representative for District 34, but lost to fellow Democrat Wilford Carter.

References

1964 births
Living people
American football defensive backs
LSU Tigers football players
Denver Broncos players
Phoenix Cardinals players
Players of American football from Louisiana
Sportspeople from Lake Charles, Louisiana